Phthisiology is the care, treatment, and study of tuberculosis of the lung. It is therefore considered a specialisation within the area of pulmonology. 

The term derives from the designation by Hippocrates of phthisis (Greek φθίσις) meaning "consumption".

References

Pulmonology
Medical specialties